U15 or U-15 may refer to:

 German submarine U-15, one of several German submarines
 U-15, a nickname for the Finnish curler Markku Uusipaavalniemi
 U-15, a subcategory used in Japanese junior idol products.
 U15 (Berlin), a line on the Berlin U-Bahn
 U15 Group of Canadian Research Universities
 U15 (German Universities), a group of 15 research-intensive universities in Germany
 For the U15 Bandy World Championship, see Youth Bandy World Championship
 an association football competition for players under 15 years old.

See also

 
 
 
 W15 (disambiguation)
 V15 (disambiguation)
 15 (disambiguation)
 U (disambiguation)